The 1993 Georgia Southern Eagles football team represented Georgia Southern University as a member of the Southern Conference (SoCon) during the 1993 NCAA Division I-AA football season. Led by fourth-year head coach Tim Stowers, the Eagles compiled an overall record of 10–3 with a conference mark of 7–1, winning the SoCon title. Georgia Southern was invited to the NCAA Division I-AA Football Championship playoffs, where they beat  in the first round before losing to eventual national champion Youngstown State in the quarterfinals. The Eagles played their home games at Paulson Stadium in Statesboro, Georgia.

Schedule

References

Georgia Southern
Georgia Southern Eagles football seasons
Southern Conference football champion seasons
Georgia Southern Eagles football